The Sam Ragan Awards are an annual fine arts award presented by St. Andrews University in Laurinburg, North Carolina. The award honors Sam Ragan who was a North Carolina Poet Laureate and North Carolina's first Secretary of Cultural Resources. It is presented annually for "outstanding contributions to the Fine Arts of North Carolina over an extended period--including, but above and beyond--the recipient's own primary commitment."

Sam Ragan Fine Arts Award Winners
Listed below are the recipients of The Sam Ragan Fine Arts Award.

References

Arts awards in the United States
North Carolina culture